Neville Meaney (July 2, 1932, Adelaide – May 30, 2021) was a noted historian of Australia, considered among the "foremost thinkers in the field of foreign and defence policy history" with a special focus on the early twentieth century and questions of Australia's cultural and geopolitical place in the world. Born in Adelaide, he was the first Australian historian to be awarded an American PhD, at Duke University. Returning to Australia in 1959, he taught first at UNSW before moving to the University of Sydney in 1962, remaining there for the rest of his career. His monograph Australia and the World (1985) is considered a "comprehensive documentary history of Australia’s relations with the world of nations." Later works continued to consider Australia's place in the world, including as regarded the rising importance of Asia.

A festschrift in his honour was published in 2013, recognising (in the words of Dennis Richardson (diplomat)) his "major contribution...to the development and evolution of Australian and American foreign relations history in this country [Australia]."

References

 

Australian historians
Historians of Australia
1932 births
2021 deaths